Mueang Samut Songkhram is the capital district (amphoe mueang) of Samut Songkhram province, central Thailand.

History
The district was established in 1897, then named Lom Thuan and controlled by Monthon Ratchaburi. In 1900 the district office was moved to a temple area in Ban Prok. The district was named accordingly in 1917. The office was moved again to Mae Klong camp, Mae Klong Subdistrict, and at the same time the name changed to Mae Klong in 1925. In accordance with governmental policy  that the capital district name should be the same as the provincial name, Mae Klong district was renamed "Mueang Samut Songkhram" in 1938. Since 1964 the district office is in Tambon Mae Klong.

Thai local people still call Mueang Samut Songkhram by its old name Mae Klong.

Geography

The district is on the shore of the Bay of Bangkok, at the mouth of the Mae Klong River.

Neighboring districts are (from the south clockwise) Ban Laem Phetchaburi province, Amphawa, and Bang Khonthi of Samut Songkhram, and Ban Phaeo and Mueang Samut Sakhon of Samut Sakhon province.

Off the coast are the sandbanks of Don Hoi Lot famous for its endemic shell population of Solen regularis. The site has been listed as a Ramsar wetland since 2001.

Administration
The district is divided into 11 sub-districts (tambons), which are further subdivided into 85 villages (mubans). Samut Songkhram itself has town status (thesaban mueang) and covers tambon Mae Klong. There are a further 10 tambon administrative organizations (TAO).

References

External links
amphoe.com (Thai)

Mueang Samut Songkhram